The 1943 Liberator crash at Whenuapai was an aircraft accident in New Zealand during World War II.

History
The Consolidated C-87 Liberator Express aircraft, owned by the USAAF and operated using a United Airlines crew, was transferring Japanese men, women, and children of the Consular Corps, to exchange for Allied POWs. On 2 August 1943, it took off from Whenuapai Aerodrome runway 04 at 2:20 am, with rain and fog conditions at minimums for departure, and quickly passed through low stratus. Captain Herschel Laughlin's gyro horizon had inadvertently been left caged – while the instrument displayed level flight, the aircraft entered a steepening bank to the left. The third bounce threw its first officer, R. John Wisda, out through the canopy; he rolled end over end about  through mud and reeds. A medic later found him trying to keep warm near a burning tyre. R. John Wisda survived the crash. The major factors of the accident were the lack of a pre-flight checklist, and crew fatigue (126 flying hours in the last 26 days).

The crash killed three of the five crew (United States nationals), and eleven of the twenty-five passengers (eight Japanese and three Thai nationals). Two additional passengers died later from injuries.  took the surviving internees from Wellington to Sydney three months later.

TVNZ covered the crash during the programme Secret New Zealand in 2003, and posited the accident was covered up, due to concerns of reprisals against POWs.

Crash site 

The aircraft crashed to the ground 1¼ miles NNE of Whenuapai airfield.

References

1943 in New Zealand
Aviation accidents and incidents caused by pilot error
1940s in Auckland
Aviation accidents and incidents in New Zealand
Aviation accidents and incidents in 1943
Accidents and incidents involving the Consolidated B-24 Liberator
United Airlines accidents and incidents
1943 disasters in New Zealand